The 2012 Colorado Buffaloes football team represented the University of Colorado Boulder in the Pac-12 Conference during the 2012 NCAA Division I FBS football season. Led by second-year head coach and alumnus Jon Embree, the Buffaloes played home games on campus at Folsom Field in Boulder, Colorado. 

The season was a disaster for the Buffaloes, who were regularly blown out by their opponents. CU lost to FCS Sacramento State, and only managed a single win with a late comeback at Washington State in Mike Leach's first season with the Cougars.

Two days after the season on November 25, Embree was fired; he compiled a  record, including 1–11 in his final year. To date, this is the worst season in program history. Since 1917, CU previously had one-win seasons twice (1980, 1984; both 1–10).

Previous season
Colorado finished the 2011 season with a record of 3–10, 2–7 in Pac-12 play, tied for last place in the South Division.

Schedule

Postseason
On November 25, 2012, the university announced that Athletic Director Mike Bohn had fired head coach Jon Embree.

References

Colorado
Colorado Buffaloes football seasons
Colorado Buffaloes football